Anicius Probinus ( 395–397) was a politician and aristocrat of the Roman Empire.

Biography 

A member of the noble gens Anicia, Probinus was the son of Sextus Claudius Petronius Probus, one of the most influential men of his era and consul in 371, and of Anicia Faltonia Proba; he was then the brother of  Anicius Hermogenianus Olybrius, Anicius Petronius Probus and Anicia Proba. According to a reconstruction, Probinus was the father of Petronius Maximus, briefly Western Roman emperor in the spring of 455.

Probinus was raised with his brother Olybrius in Rome, where he was born. He and his brother Olybrius shared the consulate in 395, while both were very young; Claudian dedicated Panegyricus de consulatu Probini et Olybrii to the brothers on this occasion. Although they belonged to a traditionally pagan senatorial family, Olybrius and Probinus were Christians.

Probinus was then proconsul of Africa in 396–397. While proconsul, in 396 he received a letter from Quintus Aurelius Symmachus (Epistols, ix); on 17 March 397 he received a law preserved in the Codex Theodosianus (XII.5.3).

Arusianus Messius dedicated his Exempla elocutionem to both brothers, and Symmachus addressed a letter to both in 397 (Epistles, v).  It is known that Probinus composed verses.

Notes

Bibliography

Primary sources 
 Claudian, Panegyricus de consulatu Probini et Olybrii

Secondary sources 
 Arnold Hugh Martin Jones, John Robert Martindale, John Morris, The Prosopography of the Later Roman Empire, Volume 1, Cambridge University Press, 1971, pp. 734–735.
 Drinkwater, John, and Hugh Elton, Fifth-Century Gaul: A Crisis of Identity?, Cambridge University Press, 1992, pp. 119–120.
 Hartmut Leppin, Theodosius der Große. Wissenschaftliche Buchgesellschaft, Darmstadt 2003, p. 222.

4th-century Christians
4th-century Romans
4th-century Roman consuls
Probinus
Imperial Roman consuls
Roman governors of Africa
Politicians from Rome